Tonite's Music Today is an album by saxophonist Zoot Sims and trombonist Bob Brookmeyer recorded in 1956 for the Storyville label.

Reception

The Allmusic review by Scott Yanow described the album featuring "colorful jammed ensembles and hard-swinging yet cool-toned solos that owe as much to the swing tradition as to the innovations of bebop".

Track listing
 "Mr. Moon" (Steve Allen) – 4:56
 "I Hear a Rhapsody" (Jack Baker, George Fragos, Dick Gasparre) – 2:27
 "The Chant" (Gerry Mulligan) – 4:27
 "Blues" (Traditional) – 5:39
 "Zoot's Tune" (Zoot Sims) – 4:42
 "How Long Has This Been Going On?" (George Gershwin, Ira Gershwin) – 4:51
 "Bobby's Tune" (Bob Brookmeyer) – 3:23
 "Blue Skies" (Irving Berlin) – 4:53

Personnel 
Zoot Sims – tenor saxophone, vocals
Bob Brookmeyer – valve trombone
Hank Jones – piano
Wyatt Reuther – bass
Gus Johnson – drums

References 

1956 albums
Storyville Records (George Wein's) albums
Bob Brookmeyer albums
Zoot Sims albums